Locust Grove is a historic house in Castalian Springs, Tennessee, U.S.. It was built in 1817 for Francis Weathered, a veteran of the American Revolutionary War and Baptist preacher. The house was designed in the Federal architectural style. It has been listed on the National Register of Historic Places since January 8, 1979.

References

Houses on the National Register of Historic Places in Tennessee
Federal architecture in Tennessee
Houses completed in 1817
Buildings and structures in Sumner County, Tennessee